Clintonville is a borough in Venango County, Pennsylvania, United States. The population was 437 at the 2020 census.

Geography
Clintonville is located at  (41.199578, -79.874360).

Demographics

As of the census of 2000, there were 528 people, 215 households, and 147 families residing in the borough. The population density was 463.5 people per square mile (178.8/km2). There were 242 housing units at an average density of 212.4 per square mile (82.0/km2). The racial makeup of the borough was 97.16% White, 1.52% African American, 0.57% Native American, 0.19% from other races, and 0.57% from two or more races. Hispanic or Latino of any race were 0.19% of the population.

There were 215 households, out of which 35.8% had children under the age of 18 living with them, 51.2% were married couples living together, 10.2% had a female householder with no husband present, and 31.6% were non-families. 27.4% of all households were made up of individuals, and 17.2% had someone living alone who was 65 years of age or older. The average household size was 2.46 and the average family size was 2.95.

In the borough the population was spread out, with 26.1% under the age of 18, 9.5% from 18 to 24, 27.5% from 25 to 44, 21.4% from 45 to 64, and 15.5% who were 65 years of age or older. The median age was 35 years. For every 100 females there were 97.8 males. For every 100 females age 18 and over, there were 90.2 males.

The median income for a household in the borough was $22,083, and the median income for a family was $29,135. Males had a median income of $23,667 versus $16,932 for females. The per capita income for the borough was $15,488. About 14.4% of families and 13.4% of the population were below the poverty line, including 16.4% of those under age 18 and 7.1% of those age 65 or over.

References

 

Boroughs in Venango County, Pennsylvania
Populated places established in 1833
1878 establishments in Pennsylvania